Serpent's Egg is a novel by R. A. Lafferty published in 1987.

Plot summary
A gathering of young, intelligent beings, some humanoid, some not, is threatened by violence and murder.

Reception
Dave Langford reviewed Serpent's Egg for White Dwarf #96, and stated that "As so often before, Lafferty moves from determined whimsy to a bloody, religiously informed and inconclusive finale; almost any paragraph is a delight to read, but in contrast to his earlier works they don't add up convincingly."

Reviews
Review by Paul Brazier (1988) in Vector 143
Review by Tom Easton (1988) in Analog Science Fiction/Science Fact, July 1988
Review by Ken Brown (1988) in Interzone, #23 Spring 1988

References

1987 American novels
1987 science fiction novels
American science fiction novels
Works by R. A. Lafferty